Barbodes palata is an extinct species of cyprinid fish endemic to Lake Lanao, Mindanao, the Philippines.  This species reached a length of  TL.  It was a commercially important species to the local peoples.

References

palata
Cyprinid fish of Asia
Freshwater fish of the Philippines
Endemic fauna of the Philippines
Fauna of Mindanao
Fish described in 1924